The 2005 Speedway World Cup (SWC) was the 5th FIM Speedway World Cup season. The Final took place on August 6, 2005 in the Olympic Stadium in Wrocław, Poland. The tournament was won by host team Poland (62 pts) and they beat defending champion Sweden (34 pts), Denmark (31 pts) and Great Britain (27 pts) in the Final.

Qualification

Tournament

Final classification

See also
 2005 Speedway Grand Prix
 2005 Team Speedway Junior World Championship

References

 
World T
2005
Speedway 2005
Cup